Kaarle McCulloch (born 20 January 1988) is an Australian former professional track cyclist and four time World Champion in the team sprint. She also won three golds at the Commonwealth Games and an Olympic bronze medal. She qualified for the Tokyo 2020 Olympics and rode in two events, the Women's Keirin where she came ninth, and the Women's Sprint where she came thirteenth.

Early years 
McCulloch grew up in Gymea New South Wales. She was a promising middle-distance runner and won middle-distance championships in the 400 metres and 800 metres events when she was 14,15 and 16.

When she was 17 her motivation in track and field waned and she turned to cycling to reinvigorate her Olympic dream. Her step-father Ken Bates introduced her to track cycling. She rose through the ranks quickly eventually competing at the UCI Junior Track World Championships.

McCulloch honed her cycling skills at the St George Cycling Club where she was supported by her sporting family. Each of the McCulloch siblings pursued their own sporting dreams. Her younger sister, Abbey McCulloch, is a netball player. She captained New South Wales Swifts. Kaarle and Abbey both attended Endeavour Sports High School. Her younger brother Jack also rode for St George Cycling Club.

Achievements 
McCulloch was part of the Australian sprint team that won bronze at the 2012 Summer Olympics.

At the 2010 Commonwealth Games she won a gold medal in the Team sprint and a silver medal in the 500m Time Trial.

McCulloch took a break from cycling following the London Olympics due a knee injury, missing the 2014 Commonwealth Games. In 2016 she missed selection for the Rio Olympics due to a contentious decision to send former teammate Anna Meares.

McCulloch returned for the 2018 Commonwealth Games winning Gold in the 500m Time Trial and Team Sprint and Silver in the Keiran and Bronze in the Sprint.

She retired from competition in November 2021.

She has a university degree in Personal Development, Health and Physical Education (PDHPE) teaching.

In February 2022 she was appointed as Podium Women’s Sprint Coach for the Great Britain Cycling Team, replacing Jan van Eijden, who left the role in November 2021.

Palmarès

2006
Australian National Track Championships – Juniors
1st 500m Time Trial
1st Sprint
3rd Keirin
2nd Team Sprint, Australian National Track Championships, Adelaide – Elite
3rd Track World Championships, Ghent – Juniors
Oceania Games
3rd 500m Time Trial
3rd Sprint, Oceania Games
2007
2nd Team Sprint, World Cup, Los Angeles
Australian National Track Championships
3rd 500m Time Trial
2nd Team Sprint
Oceania Cycling Championships
3rd Sprint
1st Keirin
1st Team Sprint
1st 500m Time Trial, European Championship
2nd Team Sprint, World Cup Sydney
2008
3rd Team Sprint, World Cup, Los Angeles
2009
1st Team Sprint (with Anna Meares), 2009–2010 UCI Track Cycling World Cup Classics, Manchester
1st Team sprint, 2008–09 UCI Track Cycling World Ranking
2010
1st Team Sprint, Track World Championships
Commonwealth Games
1st Team Sprint
2nd 500m Time Trial 
2011
1st Team Sprint (with Anna Meares), UCI Track World Championships
2012
3rd Team Sprint, Olympic Games
2nd Team Sprint (with Anna Meares), UCI Track World Championships
2013
2nd Sprint, Invercargill
2014
Oceania Track Championships
1st  Team Sprint (with Stephanie Morton)
3rd Sprint
2015
Oceania Track Championships
1st  Sprint
1st  500m Time Trial
2nd Sprint, Super Drome Cup
Melbourne Cup on Wheels
3rd Keirin
3rd Sprint
2016
 Oceania Track Championships
1st  Sprint
1st  500m time trial
ITS Melbourne DISC Grand Prix
2nd Keirin
3rd Sprint
3rd Sprint, ITS Melbourne Grand Prix
2017
Oceania Track Championships
1st  Team Sprint (with Stephanie Morton)
2nd Sprint
2nd Team Sprint, UCI World Track Championships (with Stephanie Morton)
US Sprint GP
2nd Keirin
3rd Sprint
2nd Sprint, ITS Melbourne – DISC Grand Prix
ITS Melbourne – Hisense Grand Prix
2nd Sprint
2nd Keirin
Austral
3rd Keirin
3rd Sprint
3rd Keirin, Fastest Man on Wheels
3rd Sprint, Keirin Cup / Madison Cup
2018
Commonwealth Games
1st Team Sprint (with Stephanie Morton)
1st 500m Time Trial
2nd Keirin
3rd Sprint

References

External links

1988 births
Living people
Australian female cyclists
Sportswomen from New South Wales
Commonwealth Games bronze medallists for Australia
Commonwealth Games gold medallists for Australia
Commonwealth Games silver medallists for Australia
Cyclists at the 2010 Commonwealth Games
UCI Track Cycling World Champions (women)
Australian Institute of Sport cyclists
Cyclists at the 2012 Summer Olympics
Olympic cyclists of Australia
Olympic medalists in cycling
Olympic bronze medalists for Australia
New South Wales Institute of Sport alumni
Medalists at the 2012 Summer Olympics
Cyclists from Sydney
Commonwealth Games medallists in cycling
People educated at Endeavour Sports High School
Australian track cyclists
Cyclists at the 2020 Summer Olympics
Australian cycling coaches
Medallists at the 2010 Commonwealth Games